Tragowel is a locality in the north-western Victoria, Australia.

History
The Tragowel Plains Irrigation Trust (1886) and the Macorna North Irrigation Trust (1893), provided water for farms, crop irrigation and livestock.

Burke and Wills
The expedition by Burke and Wills to the Gulf of Carpentaria passed through the Tragowel area. On 2 September 1860, the expedition, led by Robert O'Hara Burke, arrived at the homestead of Abraham Booth and John Holloway, called Tragowell Station (later renamed Tragowel Estate), on the Loddon River.. The homestead has since been demolished, but a piano played by Burke still exists, and is owned by Holloway's grandson.

Demographics
In the 2021 census, the population of Tragowel was 83, 53.2% males and 46.8% females, with a median age of 48.

Transport
Tragowel is not situated on any major highways, but the Loddon Valley Highway runs 4 km to the west of the town. There are currently no sealed roads leading into or out of the town.

The Piangil railway line runs through the town, but Tragowel railway station closed in the 1970s and nothing remains of it.

The nearest airport is located in Kerang. There are no regular flights in or out of the airport.

References

External links

Towns in Victoria (Australia)